Justin Howard "Mike" Fitzgerald (June 26, 1891 to January 17, 1945) was a Major League Baseball player. He batted and threw right-handed.

He was born and died in San Mateo, California.

References

External links

1891 births
1945 deaths
Baseball players from California
Brooklyn Dodgers scouts
Jersey City Skeeters players
Major League Baseball outfielders
New York Highlanders players
People from San Mateo, California
Philadelphia Phillies players
Portland Beavers players
Sacramento Senators players
Sacramento Solons managers
San Francisco Seals (baseball) players
Santa Clara Broncos baseball coaches
Sioux City Packers players